Norman Adolph Henry Bower (18 May 1907 – 7 December 1990) was a British Conservative Party politician.

In December 1941, he was elected as Member of Parliament (MP) for Harrow at a by-election following the death of Conservative MP Sir Isidore Salmon. The Harrow constituency was abolished for the 1945 election, when Bower was re-elected to the House of Commons for the new Harrow West constituency.  He held the seat comfortably at the 1950 election, but resigned from Parliament in April 1951.

References

External links 
 

1907 births
1990 deaths
Conservative Party (UK) MPs for English constituencies
UK MPs 1935–1945
UK MPs 1945–1950
UK MPs 1950–1951